Pierre-Hugues Herbert and Konstantin Kravchuk was the defending champion, but chose not to defend their title.

Seeds

Draw

References
 Main Draw

Trophee des Alpilles - Doubles
2015 Doubles